Istana Woodneuk is an abandoned two-storey palace at the former Tyersall Park, bounded by Holland Road and Tyersall Avenue, near the Singapore Botanic Gardens in Singapore. Before it was rebuilt in 1935 it was known as Istana Woodneuk. It suffered a major fire in 2006 and has been deemed beyond repair. The remains of the palace, as well as the land it sits on, is private land belonging to the State of Johor. It is not charted on most modern maps and is currently not accessible to the public.

The former palace is commonly confused with the demolished Istana Tyersall, which is nearby. The most obvious difference between the two former palaces is the colour of the roof tiles: Istana Tyersall had red tiles, while those of Istana Woodneuk were blue.

History
in the mid 1800s, Woodneuk House was located on a 36-acre section of the Tyersall Park estate owned by the English trader Captain John Dill Ross. Ross died in 1888 and is memorialized in a biography written by his son John Dill Ross Jr. William Napier owned an adjoining estate. Both of these plots of land were sold to Wan Abu Bakar ibni Daeng Ibrahim in 1860. Abu Bakar became Temenggong of Johor when his father, Temenggong Daeng Ibrahim died in 1862. Three days after his father's death he moved his residence to the new combined estate, Tyersall, from Telok Blangah. He made Woodneuk House his main residence (Istana).

The Istana Woodneuk served as a temporary residence for Sultan Abu Bakar's third wife Sultana Fatimah bte Abdullah, She was overseeing the design and planning of Istana Tyersall, which was under construction on a small hill not far away from Woodneuk. Sultana Fatimah did not live to see the completion of the palace she designed; Istana Tyersall was completed in 1892, a year after her death on 25 February 1891.

Abu Bakar made a will on 14 April 1895 bequeathing the palace to his fourth wife, Sultana Khadijah. He died on 4 June 1895. Sultana Khadijah died in the palace on 1 February 1904, and Abu Bakar's son and successor Sultan Ibrahim Al-Marhum took over.

The former palace was later taken down. On its former site, a replacement structure, Istana Wooden York, was later designed by Denis Santry of Swan & Maclaren, and built by Nanyang Structural Co. Construction began in 1932 and was completed in 1935, in time for the celebration of the 62nd birthday of Sultan Ibrahim of Johor and his 40 years of reign. The new palace was built for Sultan Ibrahim and his Scottish wife Sultanah Helen. Its new name Wooden York was not generally used, except for a few members of the royal family in the State of Johor, as the name Woodneuk was well entrenched.

In 1939, Sultan Ibrahim lent part of the Tyersall estate to be used by the Indian Army as a military camp area to support an effort to mechanise the Indian Army in preparation for World War II. The palace itself continued as the royal residence for the Sultan's family before the beginning of the Battle of Singapore in 1942. Sultan Ibrahim himself was primarily based in Johor.

On 9 February 1942, during the Battle of Singapore, the palace temporarily served as the headquarters of the 2/30th Battalion AIF under Major General Gordon Bennett. It was incorrectly known as "Tyersall Palace" by the battalion stationed there.

On 11 February 1942, after a blast of Japanese mortar attack indicated that the nearby junction of Holland Road and Ulu Pandan Road was held by the Japanese Imperial Army, Major General Bennet withdrew his headquarters to Tanglin Barracks.

Aftermath
After Singapore was liberated in 1945, the palace was briefly occupied by General Sir Miles Dempsey, followed by Commander-in-Chief Sir Montagu Stopford in 1946. On 16 January 1947, Governor-General of Malaya Malcolm MacDonald and his wife Audrey Marjorie Rowley moved into the palace after their long journey from Canada. By 1948 it was returned to the Sultan for his official use.

In December 1951 the State of Johor spent S$14,500 to re-roof the palace and the Istana Besar in Johor Bahru. From 1957 to 1986, the palace and its compound were maintained by caretaker Hj. Sulaiman, hired by Johor State Council, who lived with his family not far away from the building.

The Singapore Government made a compulsory purchase of Tyersall Park in December 1990, but it remained inaccessible to the public and was left abandoned and uncared for. The palace fell into ruin and the surroundings were covered by thick vegetation due to decades of abandonment. It became a spot for ghost seekers and photographers due to its inaccessibility. Its walls were graffitied by vandals, and it was used as a store by construction workers for a nearby construction site.

On 10 July 2006, the palace burned down due to a major fire attributed to drug addicts. Its blue roof tiles caved in and its condition was deemed beyond repair and structurally unsafe. In April 2015, the forest path leading to the premises was cordoned off by the Singapore Police. In February 2016, a police signboard was spotted near the path warning would-be trespassers to stay away.

See also
 Istana Tyersall
 Tyersall Park
 Abu Bakar of Johor
 Ibrahim of Johor

References

Places in Singapore
Abandoned buildings and structures
Palaces in Singapore
Royal residences in Singapore
Protected areas of Singapore
Houses completed in 1935
1935 establishments in Singapore
20th-century architecture in Singapore